Anjandoh is a village in the Karmala taluka of Solapur district in Maharashtra state, India.

Demographics
Covering  and comprising 461 households at the time of the 2011 census of India, Anjandoh had a population of 1934. There were 1010 males and 924 females, with 232 people being aged six or younger.

References

Villages in Karmala taluka